Abalistes stellatus is a member of the triggerfish family that occurs along the coasts of the Indian Ocean, the Red Sea, the Persian Gulf, and along the western edge of the Pacific Ocean.

Environment 
Abalistes stellatus lives primarily in mud and silt; however, on sloping ground it often is found some distance above the surface. It is generally found on deep coastal slopes. Adults may be found in estuaries, and juveniles of the species spend much of their pre-adult life there for protection. As a result of these varied habitats, adults range from 7–350 m in depth.

Biology 
Abalistes stellatus grows to be about 60 cm in length. It has 25-27 dorsal rays (including spines) and 24-25 anal rays. As well its body is dark gray fading to olive and is covered in small white spots.

References

Balistidae
Fish described in 1798